Parys is a town in South Africa.

Parys may also refer to:

 Parys Mountain, on Anglesey, Wales
 Parys, Warmian-Masurian Voivodeship, Polish village
 Parys (name), includes a list of people with the name
 De Parys, electoral ward and area within the town of Bedford, Bedfordshire, England

See also
 
 
 Paries, Latin for wall
 PARY, code for Ruby Airport
 Paris (disambiguation)